133 (one hundred [and] thirty-three) is the natural number following 132 and preceding 134.

In mathematics
133 is an n whose divisors (excluding n itself) added up divide φ(n). It is an octagonal number and a happy number.

133 is a Harshad number, because it is divisible by the sum of its digits.

133 is a repdigit in base 11 (111) and base 18 (77), whilst in base 20 it is a cyclic number formed from the reciprocal of the number three.

133 is a semiprime: a product of two prime numbers, namely 7 and 19. Since those prime factors are Gaussian primes, this means that 133 is a Blum integer.

133 is the number of compositions of 13 into distinct parts.

In the military
 Douglas C-133 Cargomaster was a United States cargo aircraft built between 1956 and 1961
  is a  heavy landing craft which launched in 1972
  was a United States Navy Mission Buenaventura-class fleet oilers during World War II
  was a United States Navy  during World War II
  was a United States Navy  during World War II
  was a United States Navy General G. O. Squier-class transport ship during World War II
  was a United States Navy  during World War I
  was a United States Navy  during World War II
  was a United States Navy  during World War II
  was a United States Navy S-class submarine during World War II
  was a United States Navy  during World War II
  was a United States Navy  heavy cruiser during the Korean War
 Frontstalag 133 was a temporary German prisoner of war camp during World War II located near Rennes, northern France
 Caproni Ca.133 was a three-engine transport/bomber aircraft used by the Italian Regia Aeronautica from the Second Italo-Abyssinian War until World War II
 Naval Mobile Construction Battalion 133 is an active duty Seabee battalion originally commissioned during World War II as the 133rd Naval Construction Battalion(NCB)

In transportation
 London Buses route 133 is a Transport for London contracted bus route in London
 RATB route 133 is bus route run by RATB in Bucharest, Romania
 The Fiat 133, also called  SEAT 133, was a small rear-engine car developed in Spain between 1974 and 1979
 STS-133 is a Space Shuttle Endeavour contingency mission which was Discoverys 39th and final mission. The mission launched on 24 February 2011, and landed on 9 March 2011.
 The Bücker Bü 133 Jungmeister was a single-engine, single-seat biplane trainer of the Luftwaffe in the 1930s

In other fields133''' is also:
 The nickname of Craig Jones
 The year AD 133 or 133 BC
 133 AH is a year in the Islamic calendar that corresponds to 750 – 751 CE
 133P/Elst-Pizarro is a body with characteristics of both asteroids and comets, a prototype of main-belt comets
 133 Cyrene is an S-type  main belt asteroid
 The atomic number of an element temporarily called untritrium.  
 Xenon-133 is an isotope of xenon. It is a radionuclide that is inhaled to assess pulmonary function, and to image the lungs
 133 is the police emergency telephone number in Chile
 "133" is the name of a David Guetta song, from the album Just a Little More Love (perhaps because it is a happy number)
 Cosmos 133 was a Soviet Soyuz programme test satellite launched from the Baikonur cosmodrome aboard a Vostok rocket in 1966
 PC133 is a computer memory standard defined by the JEDEC
 FASB 133 is a Statements of Financial Accounting Standards No. 133, Accounting for Derivative Instruments and Hedging Activities, an accounting standard issued in 2001 by the Financial Accounting Standards Board that provides companies with the ability to measure assets and liabilities
 OMB A-133 Compliance Supplement is a guide created by the Office of Management and Budget (OMB) for auditing United States Federal assistance and Federal grants
 The 2006 film 133 Skyway'' starring Terry Barnhart from Big Soul Productions Inc.
 Sonnet 133 by William Shakespeare
 The Municipal District of Spirit River No. 133 is a municipal district in northwest Alberta, Canada, north of Grande Prairie
 In Austria, the phone number for the police.

See also 
 List of highways numbered 133
 United Nations Security Council Resolution 133
 United States Supreme Court cases, Volume 133

References

Integers